North Korea, officially the Democratic People's Republic of Korea, competed at the 2016 Summer Olympics in Rio de Janeiro, Brazil, from 5 to 21 August 2016. This was the nation's tenth appearance at the Summer Olympics.

The Olympic Committee of the Democratic People's Republic of Korea sent the nation's smallest delegation to the Games since 2000. A total of 31 athletes, 11 men and 20 women, were selected for the North Korean team across nine different sports, marking the fourth straight Games to feature more female athletes than male. North Korea did not register any of its entrants in boxing for the first time since 1972, but was represented in artistic gymnastics for the first time in eight years, after missing out of London 2012 due to a two-year suspension for age falsification.

Notable athletes on the North Korean roster included weightlifting champions Om Yun-chol (men's 56 kg) and Rim Jong-sim (women's 75 kg), twins Kim Hye-gyong and Kim Hye-song in the women's marathon, pistol shooter and three-time Olympian Kim Jong-su, and former gymnastics champion Hong Un-jong in the women's vault. Weightlifting rookie Choe Jon-wi was selected by the committee to lead the North Korean delegation as the flag bearer in the opening ceremony.

North Korea left Rio de Janeiro with a total of seven medals (2 golds, 3 silver, and 2 bronze), signifying its most successful Olympic outcome based on the overall medal count, but falling short of the 12-medal target set by its sports commission. Half of North Korea's medal haul was distributed to the weightlifters, while the rest to the competitors in artistic gymnastics, shooting, and table tennis. Among the medalists were Rim Jong-sim, who repeated her golden feat from London four years earlier in a heavier category, and double world champion Ri Se-gwang, who obtained the nation's first ever gymnastics title by a male after 24 years.

Medalists

Archery
 
One North Korean archer qualified for the women's individual recurve by obtaining one of the three Olympic places available from the 2015 Asian Archery Championships in Bangkok, Thailand.

Athletics (track and field)
 
North Korean athletes have so far achieved qualifying standards in the following athletics events (up to a maximum of three athletes in each event):

Track & road events

Diving 
 
North Korean divers qualified for the following individual spots and synchronized teams at the 2016 Olympic Games by having achieved a top three finish from the 2015 World Championships.

Gymnastics

Artistic
North Korea has qualified one male and one female artistic gymnast each for of the following apparatus and all-around events through the 2015 World Championships.

Men

Women

Judo
 
North Korea has qualified three judokas for each of the following weight classes at the Games. Hong Kuk-hyon and Kyong Sol were ranked among the top 22 eligible judokas for men and top 14 for women in the IJF World Ranking List of 30 May 2016, while Kim Sol-mi at women's extra-lightweight (48 kg) earned a continental quota spot from the Asian region as the highest-ranked North Korean judoka outside of direct qualifying position.

Shooting
 
North Korean shooters have achieved quota places for the following events by virtue of their best finishes at the 2014 and 2015 ISSF World Championships, the 2015 ISSF World Cup series, and Asian Championships, as long as they obtained a minimum qualifying score (MQS) as of March 31, 2016.

Qualification Legend: Q = Qualify for the next round; q = Qualify for the bronze medal (shotgun)

Table tennis

North Korea has fielded a team of three athletes into the table tennis competition at the Games. Kim Song I and 2012 Olympian Ri Myong-sun scored a second-stage draw victory each to book two of six remaining Olympic spots in the women's singles at the Asian Qualification Tournament in Hong Kong.

Ri Mi-gyong was awarded the third spot to build the women's team for the Games by virtue of a top 10 national finish in the ITTF Olympic Rankings.

Weightlifting

North Korean weightlifters have qualified a maximum of six men's and four women's quota places for the Rio Olympics based on their combined team standing by points at the 2014 and 2015 IWF World Championships. The team must allocate these places to individual athletes by 20 June 2016.

On 22 June 2016, the International Weightlifting Federation decided to strip one men's and one women's entry place each from North Korea to the Olympics because of "multiple positive cases" of doping throughout the qualifying period.

Men

Women

Wrestling

North Korea has qualified a total of four wrestlers for each of the following weight classes into the Olympic competition. Three of them finished among the top six to book an Olympic spot each in the men's freestyle 57 kg, men's Greco-Roman 59 kg, and women's freestyle 53 kg at the 2015 World Championships, while the other had claimed the remaining Olympic slot to round out the North Korean roster at the initial meet of the World Qualification Tournament in Ulaanbaatar.

Men's freestyle

Men's Greco-Roman

Women's freestyle

References

External links 

 
 

Olympics
Nations at the 2016 Summer Olympics
2016